The Broad Progressive Front (FAP) was a legislative, electoral and governmental coalition of center-left and leftist political parties in México. The FAP was founded after the 2006 Mexican general election following the final agreements that the extinct Coalition for the Good of All took. The FAP was composed of the Party of the Democratic Revolution (PRD) the Labor Party (PT) and the Citizens' Movement (MC).

References 

2006 in Mexican politics
2007 in Mexican politics
Citizens' Movement (Mexico)
Defunct left-wing political party alliances
Defunct political party alliances in Mexico
Labor Party (Mexico)
Party of the Democratic Revolution
Socialist parties in Mexico
Mexico